Pout may refer to:
 A facial expression
 Facial expression of air kiss
 Pout, Senegal, a commune in Thiès Region, western Senegal
 Trisopterus luscus or Pouting, a fish in the family Gadidae
 Ocean pout, a kind of eelpout in the family Zoarcidae
 Brown bullhead, or "horned pout", a widespread species of small catfish native to the Eastern United States

Pouting 

Pouting may refer to:
 Pouting, a contraction of the muscles in the lips, either voluntarily or as a result of a snout reflex
 Pouting (fish), a fish found along the European coast